The Dagar gharana (or Dagar vani) is a tradition of the classical dhrupad genre of Hindustani classical music spanning 20 generations, tracing back to Swami Haridas (15th century), and including Behram Khan of Jaipur (1753-1878). For some generations its members were associated with the courts of Jaipur, Udaipur, and Mewar.

The main feature of the Dagar gharana is sophisticated, subtle, serene and rigorous exposition of alap-jor-jhala, including great attention to microtonal inflection delineating the subtleties of raga often otherwise overlooked or lost.

Until the 20th century, it was exclusively a vocal genre (at least in performance), but since the innovations of Zia Mohiuddin Dagar to the rudra vina, that instrument has found a place in performance, following closely the inflections and style of the vocal technique.

The genre was carried into the 20th century by seven Dagar brothers and cousins: Aminuddin Dagar and Nasir Moinuddin (Senior Dagar Brothers), Rahim Fahimuddin Dagar, Nasir Zaheeruddin and Nasir Fayyazuddin (Junior Dagar Brothers), H. Sayeeduddin Dagar, and the brothers Zia Mohiuddin Dagar and Zia Fariduddin Dagar. Zia Mohiuddin (rudra vina) and Zia Fareeduddin (vocal) were largely responsible for training today's practitioners, the most prominent of whom include Ritwik Sanyal, Pushparaj Koshti, Wasifuddin Dagar, Bahauddin Dagar, Asit Kumar Banerjee, Uday Bhawalkar, and the Gundecha Brothers.

Family pedagogy
This visualization is based on several historical accounts.

Exponents

15th century
 Swami Haridas Dagar (1480-1573), guru of Miyan Tansen.

16th century
 Gadadhar Pandey alias Masnad Ali Khan Dagar
 Gyandhar Pandey alias Surgyan Khan Dagar

17th century
 Rahim Baksh Khan Dagar, father and guru of Baba Gopal Das.

18th century
 Baba Gopal Das alias Imam Baksh Khan Dagar (c. 1720 - c. 1800)
 Haider Khan Dagar (1750-1830), son and disciple of Baba Gopal Das.
 Behram Khan Dagar (1753-1878), son and disciple of Baba Gopal Das.
 Addan Khan (c. 1750s - c. 1800s), daughter and disciple of Baba Gopal Das.

19th century
 Mohammed Jan Khan Dagar (1795-1850), son and disciple of Haider Khan Dagar.
 Mohammad Ali Khan Dagar (c. 1800 - c. 1870), son and disciple of Haider Khan Dagar.
 Akbar Khan, son and disciple of Behram Khan Dagar.
 Saddu Khan (1800-1860), son and disciple of Behram Khan Dagar.
 Bande Ali Khan (1826-1890), learned from maternal uncle Behram Khan Dagar.
 Inayat Khan Dagar (1835-1900), son and disciple of Saddu Khan Dagar.
 Zakiruddin Khan Dagar (1840-1923), son and disciple of Mohammed Jan Khan Dagar.
 Allabande Khan Dagar (1845-1927), son and disciple of Mohammed Ali Khan Dagar.
 Haider Khan of Dhar, disciple of Behram Khan Dagar.

20th century
 Riazuddin Khan Dagar (1885-1947), son and disciple of Inayat Khan Dagar.
 Ziauddin Khan Dagar (1886-1946), son and disciple of Zakiruddin Khan Dagar.
 Nasiruddin Dagar (1895-1936), son and disciple of Allabande Khan Dagar.
 Rahimuddin Dagar (1900-1975), son and disciple of Allabande Khan Dagar.
 Imamuddin Dagar (1903-1966), son and disciple of Allabande Khan Dagar.
 Hussainuddin Dagar (1906-1963), son and disciple of Allabande Khan Dagar.
 Nasir Moinuddin Dagar (1921-1967), son and disciple of Nasiruddin Dagar. With brother Aminuddin, known as Senior Dagar Brothers.
 Nasir Aminuddin Dagar (1923-2000), son and disciple of Nasiruddin Dagar. With brother Moinuddin, known as Senior Dagar Brothers.
 Rahim Fahimuddin Dagar (1927-2011), son and disciple of Rahimuddin Dagar.
 Zia Mohiuddin Dagar (1929-1990), son and disciple of Ziauddin Dagar.
 Nasir Zahiruddin Dagar (1932-1994), son and disciple of Nasiruddin Dagar. With brother Faiyazuddin, known as Junior Dagar Brothers.
 Zia Fariuddin Dagar (1932-2013), son and disciple of Ziauddin Dagar.
 Nasir Faiyazuddin Dagar (1934-1989), son and disciple of Nasiruddin Dagar. With brother Zahiruddin, known as Junior Dagar Brothers.
 Chandrashekar Naringrekar (1936-2004), disciple of Zia Mohiduddin Dagar.
 Asit Kumar Banerjee (b. 19370, disciple of Zia Mohiuddin Dagar.
 H. Sayeeduddin Dagar (1939-2017), son and disciple of Hussainuddin Dagar.
 Shantha Benegal (b. 1942), disciple of Zia Mohiuddin Dagar.
 Jody Stetcher (b. 1946), disciple of Zia Mohiuddin Dagar.
 Pushpraj Koshti (b. 1951), disciple of Zia Mohiuddin Dagar.
 Ritwik Sanyal (b. 1953), disciple of Zia Mohiuddin Dagar and Zia Fariduddin Dagar.
 Umakant Gundecha (b. 1959), disciple of Zia Fariduddin Dagar.
 Ramakant Gundecha (1962-2019), disciple of Zia Fariduddin Dagar.
 Uday Bhawalkar (b. 1966), disciple of Zia Fariduddin Dagar and Zia Mohiuddin Dagar.
 F. Wasifuddin Dagar (b. 1968), son and disciple of Nasir Faiyazuddin Dagar.
 Mohi Bahauddin Dagar (b. 1970), son and disciple of Zia Mohiuddin Dagar.
 Sayeed Nafeesuddin Dagar (b. 1975), son and disciple of H. Sayeeduddin Dagar.
 Sayeed Aneesuddin Dagar (b. 1976), son and disciple of H. Sayeeduddin Dagar.

21st century
 Pelva Naik (b. 1986), disciple of Zia Fariduddin Dagar and Mohi Bahauddin Dagar.
 Anant Gundecha (b. 1996), son and disciple of Ramakant Gundecha.

References

Vocal gharanas